Mecc Alte is an Italian electrical engineering company that makes electrical generators. It is based in Vicenza, in the Veneto region of north-east Italy.

History
It was founded in 1947 in Alte near Vincenza.

Products
The types of synchronous alternators it makes are:
 2 pole (1 - 208 kVA)
 4 pole (3.5 - 3000 kVA)
 6 pole (500 - 2100 kVA)

It also makes
 Permanent magnets
 Welding generators

See also 

List of Italian companies

References

External links
 Mecc Alte
 CREI Ven (research centre)

Engineering companies of Italy
Rail industry
Italian companies established in 1947
Electronics companies established in 1947
Italian brands
Companies based in Veneto